The Metrohan Building is a 7-story office building in Beyoğlu, Istanbul. The building was built between 1912 and 1914. The building gets its name from the railway itself; as Metro Han can be translated to Metro House or Metro Building.

History

When Beyoğlu station was under construction between 1871 and 1874, plans to construct a 5-story hotel building above the station were drawn out by chief engineer of the project, Eugène-Henri Gavand. However, when Gavand's shares in the railway were bought out, his plans for a hotel were also scrapped.

The ground floor of the Metrohan building was the original Beyoğlu station structure, which opened in 1875. The original structure consisted of a wooden A-frame roof on top of the ground floor stone structure that exists today. In 1911, a Belgium company SOFINA bought the operating rights of the railway and needed a central office in Istanbul, known at the time as Constantinople. Plans to build a 6-story office building on top of Beyoğlu station were drawn up in Charleroi, Belgium by Turkish-Armenian architect Mikayel Nurican and construction began in 1912. The original office building consisted of 4 floors (including the ground floor) with a smaller 2-story tower at the top. The building was completed in 1914 and became the headquarters of Tünel operations. In 1928, the 2-story tower was expanded as 2 extra floors and a 7th floor was constructed on top, bringing the building to its current height and shape. Istanbul Elektrik, Tramvay ve Tünel İşletmeleri (I.E.T.T.) bought the Tünel railway as well as the Metrohan building and began using it as their own general headquarters. IETT kept their headquarters in the building until 1983, when they moved to a newer building on top of Karaköy station. Today the building is still owned by IETT and used as an office building.

See also
Beyoğlu (Tünel) - the railway station located within the Metrohan Building

References

Office buildings in Turkey
Buildings and structures in Beyoğlu
Buildings and structures completed in 1914